Angelo Nathaniel Constantino was a Filipino bowler who was a gold medalist at the singles event of the 1992 World Youth Bowling Championships in Venezuela. He also won the gold medal in the doubles event of the same tournament along with Noberito Constantino as well as the silver medal in the all-events and a bronze in the Masters. He was also part of the silver medal winning team of five at the 1994 Asian Games.

After retiring from competitive bowling, Angelo Constantino dedicated more focus on being a bowling coach and mentored a team based at the E-Lanes Bowling Center in Greenhills, San Juan, Metro Manila.

On January 11, 2019, Constantino was shot multiple times by a man at the E-Lanes Bowling Center and died while he was being rushed to a nearby hospital. Until his death, he worked as a manager at E-Lanes. He was aged 48.

References

Filipino ten-pin bowling players
2019 deaths
Asian Games medalists in bowling
Bowlers at the 1994 Asian Games
Asian Games silver medalists for the Philippines
Medalists at the 1994 Asian Games